Mickler Spur is a narrow spur,  long, forming the south wall of Hueneme Glacier in the western Wisconsin Range, Antarctica, and terminating at Reedy Glacier. It was mapped by the United States Geological Survey from surveys and U.S. Navy air photos, 1960–64, and was named by the Advisory Committee on Antarctic Names for equipment operator Raymond R. Mickler, a member of the winter parties at Byrd Station in 1961 and McMurdo Station in 1964.

References

Ridges of Marie Byrd Land